Tentax scoblei is a moth of the family Erebidae first described by Michael Fibiger in 2011. It is found in the Khasi Hills of north-eastern India.

The wingspan is 11–12 mm. The forewings are brown, including subterminal, terminal areas and fringes. There is a black-brown quadrangular patch at the upper medial area. The costa is basally black brown, subapically with small black dots. The crosslines are indistinct and light brown. The terminal line is indicated by indistinct, black-brown interveinal dots. The hindwings are grey. The underside of the forewings is unicolorous brown and the underside of the hindwings is grey with a discal spot.

References

Micronoctuini
Taxa named by Michael Fibiger
Moths described in 2011